Hanane Ouhaddou (born 1982) is a Moroccan runner who specializes in the 3000 metres steeplechase. She finished fifth in at the 2006 African Championships and ninth at the 2007 World Championships.

She served a doping ban between 2012 and 2014 for doping. In 2016 she was banned from competition again for eight years for refusing to get tested. The ban is set to end on 10 May 2024.

Her personal best time is 9:25.51 minutes, achieved in July 2007 in Heusden-Zolder.

Achievements

References

External links

1982 births
Living people
Moroccan female middle-distance runners
Moroccan female steeplechase runners
World Athletics Championships athletes for Morocco
Athletes (track and field) at the 2008 Summer Olympics
Olympic athletes of Morocco
Doping cases in athletics
Moroccan sportspeople in doping cases
Mediterranean Games gold medalists for Morocco
Mediterranean Games medalists in athletics
Athletes (track and field) at the 2009 Mediterranean Games
20th-century Moroccan women
21st-century Moroccan women